The 2007 European Baseball Championship was an international baseball tournament held from September 7 to 16, between national baseball teams of the Confederation of European Baseball. The tournament was held in Barcelona, Spain and served as the qualifying competition for the 2008 Summer Olympic Games. The Netherlands won the tournament for the 5th consecutive time and qualified for the 2008 Summer Olympics in Beijing. Great Britain and Spain advanced to a final qualifying tournament in Taiwan. Prior to the tournament, Greece was removed by the European Baseball Confederation and replaced with Austria. Czech Republic was downgraded to the last place at the end of the tournament and its wins in the preliminary round vacated. This was the first time that 5 teams instead of 2 were relegated to the B-Pool.

Qualification

Round 1

Pool A

Standings

Source: www.baseballstats.eu

Schedule

Source: www.baseballstats.eu

Pool B

Standings

Source: www.baseballstats.eu

Schedule

Source: www.baseballstats.eu

Classification games

11th/12th place

9th/10th place

7th/8th place

Source: www.baseballstats.eu

Pool C

Standings

Source: www.baseballstats.eu

Schedule

Source: www.baseballstats.eu

Final standings

Source: www.baseballstats.eu

Awards
The CEB announced the following awards at the completion of the tournament.

Attendance
Total Attendance : 19,546
Average Attendance : 465

See also
Baseball at the 2008 Summer Olympics - Qualification

References

External links
Official site.

2007
European Baseball Championship
2007
2007 in Spanish sport
Baseball qualification for the 2008 Summer Olympics